Batu Rakit is a mukim in Kuala Nerus District, Terengganu, Malaysia.

References

Kuala Nerus District
Mukims of Terengganu